Hrefna Ingimarsdóttir (30 August 1931 – 26 September 2005) was an Icelandic athletic coach, trainer and educator. She was a pioneer in women's basketball in Iceland in the 1950s and the first coach of the ÍR women's basketball team which she led to three national championships.

Early life
Hrefna was born in Hnífsdalur and graduated from Gagnfræðskóli Ísafjarðar and then from the Íþróttakennaraskólanum at Laugarvatn where she learned basketball from Sigríður Valgeirsdóttir.

Personal life
Hrefna was married to Ingi Þór Stefánsson, himself a basketball player, from 1957 until his death in 1966.

Titles
Icelandic champion (3): 1956, 1957, 1958

References

1931 births
2005 deaths
Hrefna Ingimarsdottir
Hrefna Ingimarsdottir
Hrefna Ingimarsdottir